Hagonoy, officially the Municipality of Hagonoy, is a 3rd class municipality in the province of Davao del Sur, Philippines. According to the 2020 census, it has a population of 56,919 people.

History

Before its creation into a municipality, Hagonoy was a sitio of barrio Digos, municipality of Santa Cruz. Then, when the municipality of Padada was created on July 1, 1949, Hagonoy was annexed as one of its barrios. On May 28, 1953, by virtue of Executive Order No. 596 issued by President Elpidio V. Quirino, Hagonoy was separated from Padada and became a regular municipality.Then in early 1970's, batch of Cebuanos came from Danao City, particularly from Caputatan, among them Nathaniel Capuyan and Loselo Capuno Sr., who worked in the sugarcane plantations and settled in barangay Maliit Digos. And from then on plenty of others who came from Caputatan, Danao City followed, and eventually found a place in a land owned by Alejandro Almendras.

Republic Act No. 2094, which defined the boundaries of Hagonoy, referred to its territory as comprising the barrios of Kibuaya, Upper Sacub, Lower Sacub, Maliit-Digos, La Union, Malabang, Tulogan, Malinao, Guihing, Pawa, Hagonoy, Balutakay, Leling, and Sinayawan, and the sitios of Quezon and Polopolo.

The first set of appointed municipal officials assumed office on July 5 of the same year. Since its creation into a municipality to date, two (2) appointed and seven (7) elected mayors guided the development and destiny of the town. The appointed mayors were Antonio Go Pace (Quirino Administration) and Ramon Sacedon (Magsaysay Administration). The first elected Mayor was Gonzalo S. Palamos Sr.. He served for one term (4 years). Then was elected Board Member of Davao Province (undivided) for two consecutive terms (8 years). Alfredo Salutillo then became mayor of Hagonoy for two consecutive terms Gonzalo S. Palamos Sr. was again elected mayor for his second term. Bartolome G. Hernandez Jr. (1 term and extended by the proclamation of martial law). Mayor Filomeno V. Surposa, was appointed as Officer-In-Charge under the Freedom Constitution after the famous EDSA Revolution and was elected into office during the election on January 17, 1988. Mayor Manuel M. Cabardo was elected in the 1992 elections but opted not to bid for reelection in 1995 which Mayor Filomeno V. Surposa was elected back to office. In the 1998 election, Jose M. Superales Sr. won over Ex-Mayor Filomeno V. Surposa. In the recently conducted election on May 14, 2007, Ret. Gen. Franco Magno Calida won over Jose M. Superales Sr. in a local election and assume office on June 30, 2007.

Geography

The municipality of Hagonoy has a total land area of 114.28 square kilometers representing about three (3%) percent of the total land area of the province of Davao del Sur. Located on the north-eastern coastal end of the Padada Valley, Hagonoy lies on the belly of the seahorse-like shaped province. It is bounded on the north by Digos, the provincial capital, Davao Gulf on the east, the municipality of Matanao on the west, the municipality of Kiblawan on the south-west and the municipality of Padada on the south. The seat of municipal government is located in Poblacion about 8 kilometers away from Digos.

The boundaries of the municipality of Hagonoy, Province of Davao del Sur on the North, an imaginary line cutting the Digos-Malalag-Makar road at Km. 311, running due West from the shoreline of Davao Gulf up to imaginary north–south line with longitude 125° 14′ E., then due South along the line to its intersection with an imaginary line running due shoreline of Davao Gulf cutting Digos-Malalag-Makar Road at Km. 318.1 so that the territory of the said municipality shall include the barrios of Kibuaya, Upper Sacub, Lower Sacub, Maliit Digos, La Union, Malabang, Tologan, Malinao, Guihing, Pawa, Hagonoy, Balutakay and Sinayawan and the sitios of Quezon and “Polo-polo”.

Climate

Barangays
Hagonoy is politically subdivided into 21 barangays which are grouped into three (3) major districts; the western or upland barangays, central or rice-producing barangays, and the eastern or coastal barangays. Mainly an agricultural community, upland barangays are planted with corn, sugarcane, soybeans, cotton and coconuts. The central barangays are considered as the rice granary of the municipality and that of the province, being within the service coverage area of the Padada River Irrigation System. The eastern barangays are mostly cultivated into plantation crops such as coconuts, cacao, bananas, and lately mangoes as well as fishponds. In terms of land area, the biggest barangay is Hagonoy Crossing with 1,589 hectares while the smallest is Clib with only 151 hectares.

Demographics

Economy

Notable personalities
 Jesus Dureza – Presidential Adviser on the Peace Process, 2016-2018
 Franco Magno Calida - Former Chief Superintendent, Philippine National Police and Former Metro District Commander, Philippine Constabulary
 Conrado E. Laza - DENR Undersecretary (USEC) for Indigenous Peoples Affairs and Mindanao Environmental Priority Projects and retired Police Brigadier General

References

External links

   Hagonoy Profile at the DTI Cities and Municipalities Competitive Index
 [ Philippine Standard Geographic Code]
 Philippine Census Information

Municipalities of Davao del Sur
Establishments by Philippine executive order